Kay Buena is an American singer-songwriter, musician, artist, jeweler and writer based in Austin, Texas. She is best known for "Comp Carnage", music and performance art expressing frustration  with computers, and for recordings that were popular on MP3.com in the early days of that site.

Comp Carnage
Comp Carnage consisted primarily of videos of Kay and friends shooting computers and an accompanying music video, "Ode to Geeks". As one of the first efforts of this nature, it gained coverage in The Register, which conducted a contest to give away one of the "victims".

MP3.com

When MP3.com became popular in 1999, Kay Buena made some of her recordings available there, with strong response and some commercial success with CD's such as Lady of the Highway. "Lonely Man" was particularly popular with the MP3.com staff and featured on a collection CD. She has retained copyright to her songs and made CDs available.

References

External links 
 KayBuena.com

1947 births
Living people
21st-century American sculptors
American women singer-songwriters
Artists from Austin, Texas
Musicians from Austin, Texas
Writers from Austin, Texas
20th-century American sculptors
20th-century American singers
20th-century American women artists
21st-century American women artists
Singer-songwriters from Texas
20th-century American women singers
Sculptors from Texas
21st-century American women singers